Josephine Anderson Pearson (1868 - 1944) was an American anti-suffragette, educator, writer, and lecturer who lived and traveled throughout Tennessee.

Life
Josephine Pearson was born in Gallatin, Tennessee, and raised in McMinnville, Tennessee. In 1890, she graduated from Irving College and completed her Master's Degree at Cumberland University in 1896. Pearson worked for many organizations and held positions such as the women's auxiliary president for the Dixie Highway Council of the Cumberland Divide and commissioner for the Woman's Board of the Tennessee Centennial Exposition. Pearson began her fight against suffrage after making a promise to her dying mother. She fought for women's rights by writing essays on feminism, suffrage, and related topics.In 1917, she became president of the Tennessee State Association Opposed to Women Suffrage.  Although at this time she lived in Monteagle with her father, she traveled throughout Tennessee for three years working for the association. In mid-July 1920, Pearson traveled to Nashville, Tennessee, due to a special session being called by the governor to vote on the 19th amendment. During her fight for the 19th amendment, Pearson set up headquarters at the Hermitage Hotel in Nashville, where she urged legislators to oppose ratification. 

Although Pearson never cast a vote in her lifetime, she spent the remainder of her life writing, teaching, and protesting women’s suffrage. She taught philosophy and history at the Southern Seminary of Virginia while also serving as dean. Pearson died in 1944 and was buried in the Monteagle Cemetery.

References 

1868 births
1944 deaths
Anti-suffragists
People from Gallatin, Tennessee
Educators from Tennessee